Banner is the name of the following newspapers:

 Banner (Toronto newspaper) (1843–1844), Toronto, Ontario, Canada, founded by George Brown
 Bay State Banner, Boston, Massachusetts, serving the African-American community since 1965
 Bennington Banner, Bennington, Vermont, established in 1841
 Duncan Banner, Duncan, Oklahoma
 Hillsboro Banner, Hillsboro, North Dakota, a weekly newspaper first published in 1879
 Logan Banner, Logan, West Virginia
 The Peel Banner, Brampton, Ontario, Canada, a 19th-century newspaper

See also
Cambridge Daily Banner, Cambridge, Maryland 
Cleveland Daily Banner, Cleveland, Tennessee

References